Ankily is a town and commune in Madagascar. It belongs to the district of Ihosy, which is a part of Ihorombe Region.

Only primary schooling is available. The majority 74% of the population of the commune are farmers, while an additional 10% receives their livelihood from raising livestock. The most important crop is rice, while other important products are peanuts, beans, maize and cassava. Services provide employment for 1% of the population. Additionally fishing employs 15% of the population.

References and notes 

Populated places in Ihorombe